Eupithecia pauliani is a moth in the  family Geometridae. It is found in Madagascar.

References

Moths described in 1957
pauliani
Moths of Madagascar